George Sheldon Massecar (July 10, 1904 — July 14, 1957) was a Canadian ice hockey player who played 100 games in the National Hockey League for the New York Americans between 1929 and 1932. The rest of his career, which lasted from 1925 to 1937, was spent in various minor leagues.

Career statistics

Regular season and playoffs

External links 
 

1904 births
1957 deaths
Bronx Tigers players
Buffalo Bisons (IHL) players
Canadian ice hockey left wingers
Detroit Olympics (IHL) players
Ice hockey people from Ontario
New Haven Eagles players
New York Americans players
Ontario Hockey Association Senior A League (1890–1979) players
St. Louis Flyers (AHA) players
Sportspeople from Waterloo, Ontario
Canadian expatriate ice hockey players in the United States